Harrison Trimble High School (HTHS) is a high school situated in Moncton, New Brunswick, Canada.

History
HTHS was opened in 1961 and is Moncton's biggest school after Moncton High School. Following expansions in the 1960s, there were over 2,000 students in grades 10 to 12 by 1973. Today, it serves approximately 1,300 students from grades 9 through 12. Its school mascot is the Trojan. The school is represented by the colours maroon and white, its motto being "Pride in Ourselves, Pride in our School, Pride in our Community".

Harrison Trimble High School was named after a civic-minded board Trustee who showed foresight by acquiring the parcel of land on behalf of the district, at a time when the area was mostly pasture, thereby saving the school district a lot of money when time came to build.

Harrison Trimble High School has an annual event called the Trojan Trek, where every student from the school walks to the Moncton Hospital to raise awareness for The Neonatal Unit. The students fund-raise money for the event each year. In 2008 the school had raised over $100,000 since the creation of the charity.

Controversy
The school gained notoriety in 2015 when Vice Principal Shane Sturgeon suspended a female student over the wearing of a dress that exposed her shoulders and back and was said to be a "sexual distraction". The school again received media coverage in 2015 when teacher William MacGillivray was charged with, and later convicted for, sex crimes against a female student and obstructing police.

Notable alumni

Sidney Crosby - NHL hockey player

See also
Riverview High School
Moncton High School (2015)
Bernice MacNaughton High School
Caledonia Regional High School
Tantramar Regional High School

References

External links
Harrison Trimble High School Official Website
Anglophone East School District Website
Harrison Trimble High School's Facebook Page

High schools in Moncton
Educational institutions established in 1963
1963 establishments in New Brunswick